Anna Adams Gordon (1853–1931) was an American social reformer, songwriter, and, as national president of the Woman's Christian Temperance Union when the Eighteenth Amendment was adopted, a major figure in the Temperance movement.

Biography

Early life
Gordon was born on July 21, 1853, in Boston, Massachusetts, to James M. and Mary Clarkson Gordon, both Christian abolitionists.  When she was three, her family moved to Auburndale. Elizabeth Putnam Gordon was an older sibling.

She went on to attend Boston High School, Lasell Seminary, and Mount Holyoke College.  She spent a year abroad in San Sebastián with another sister, Alice Gordon Gulick, who had started a school for girls there in 1871.

Woman's Christian Temperance Union

In 1877, Gordon met Frances E. Willard at a Dwight L. Moody revival meeting, in the building where Willard was holding temperance meetings.  Gordon's younger brother Arthur had died just days before, a traumatic event which had, as Willard later wrote, driven Gordon "Godward".  The two became close friends, with Gordon continuing to play organ for Willard's meetings.  Gordon eventually moved into Willard's residence as her personal secretary.  Gordon subsequently followed her employer on her travels through the United States, Canada and Europe, spending a year in England, mostly as the guests of Lady Henry Somerset.

Gordon and Willard remained close friends until Willard's death in 1898, at which time Lillian M. N. Stevens became president of the Woman's Christian Temperance Union, with Gordon as vice-president.  That same year, Gordon also wrote a memorial biography of Willard (expanded and reprinted in 1905).  Upon Lillian Stevens' death in 1914, Anna Adams Gordon became president of the WCTU.

During the First World War, Gordon was instrumental in convincing US President Woodrow Wilson to harden the federal government's policies against the manufacture of alcoholic beverages, most notably by criminalizing the use of foodstuffs to make alcohol.  Later, in 1919, temperance organizations scored a major victory with the ratification of the Eighteenth Amendment to the United States Constitution, which fully established prohibition in the United States.  After this success, the WCTU under Gordon's guidance began to turn more towards temperance enforcement, and causes peripheral to the temperance movement, such as citizenship for immigrants, women's rights in the workplace, and child protection.

In November 1922, she was elected president of the World Women's Temperance Union (WWCTU), and resigned her presidency of the national WCTU organization.

She died on June 15, 1931, in Castile, New York.

Works
During Gordon's career, she also became president of the World League Against Alcoholism, vice-president of the National Temperance Council, and vice-chairman of the Commission of Nineteen on the National Constitutional Prohibition Amendment. She was deeply involved in temperance work with the National Council of Women, the International Sunday-School Association, the World's Woman's Christian Temperance Union, the National Legislative Council, etc.

As a leader in the WCTU, Gordon was a staunch believer in the need to interest children in temperance at a very early age.  To that end, she authored a number of books of stories, verse, and song aimed at children, as well as publications for adults.  Sales of her books were said to have surpassed a million copies.  Her temperance songs became especially successful and were translated into multiple languages.  She was also the editor of The Union Signal, the news organ of the WCTU, and The Young Crusader, the newspaper of the Loyal Temperance Legion, the WCTU's children's branch.

References

1853 births
1931 deaths
American suffragists
American Christian socialists
American women's rights activists
Mount Holyoke College alumni
Writers from Boston
American temperance activists
People from Castile, New York
American social reformers
Songwriters from Massachusetts
American children's writers
American women children's writers
Woman's Christian Temperance Union people
Proponents of Christian feminism
American socialist feminists
Activists from New York (state)
19th-century American writers
19th-century American women writers
Female Christian socialists